The Bolivian National Congress 1960–1962 was elected on 5 June 1960.

Chamber of Deputies

Chamber of Senators

Presidents of the National Congress 

 

FSB – Bolivian Socialist Falange.

MNR – Revolutionary Nationalist Movement.

MNRA – Authentic Nationalist Revolutionary Movement (a faction of the MNR, 1959).

Notes

Political history of Bolivia